Callicore pygas, the Godart's numberwing or pygas eighty-eight, is a species of butterfly of the family Nymphalidae. It is found in Venezuela, Guyana, Ecuador, Peru, Bolivia, Paraguay and the upper Amazonian region of Brazil.

Description
Its common name refers to the black and white patterns on the undersides of its hindwings that resemble the number 88.

Similar eighty-eight patterns are found in other species of the genus and related genera such as Diaethria and Perisama.

The wingspan is about 45 mm.

The subspecies differ from each other with regard to the underside markings.

In subspecies pygas, the white band and the metallic blue scaling on the hindwing are both replaced by pale sandy yellow.

Subspecies eucale is similar to cyllene, except for the submarginal band, which is metallic blue instead of white.

Subspecies
C. p. pygas (Brazil (Bahia))
C. p. thamyras (Ménétriés, 1857) (Brazil (Minas Gerais, Mato Grosso), Paraguay, Argentina)
C. p. aphidna (Hewitson, 1869) (Venezuela)
C. p. cyllene (Doubleday, [1847]) (Ecuador, Bolivia, Peru)
C. p. eucale (Fruhstorfer, 1916) (Brazil (Santa Catarina, Rio Grande do Sul))
C. p. concolor (Talbot, 1928) (Brazil (Mato Grosso), Paraguay)
C. p. rondoni (Ribeiro, 1931) (Brazil (Rondônia))
C. p. lalannensis Brévignon, 1995 (French Guiana)

References

External links

Biblidinae
Lepidoptera of Brazil
Nymphalidae of South America
Butterflies described in 1824